"Blessed Are the Believers" is a song written by Charlie Black, Rory Bourke and Sandy Pinkard (of Pinkard & Bowden), and recorded by Canadian country music artist Anne Murray.  It was released in March 1981 as the first single from Murray's Gold-certified Where Do You Go When You Dream album.

The single was Murray's sixth number one on the Country chart, where it spent one week at number one and a total of twelve weeks on the country chart.  On the pop singles chart, it was her final Top 40 single to date, peaking at number thirty-four.

Charts

References

1981 singles
1981 songs
Anne Murray songs
Songs written by Rory Bourke
Song recordings produced by Jim Ed Norman
Capitol Records singles
Songs written by Charlie Black